James A. Scott (born January 14, 1942) is a former member of the Florida Senate and former member of the member of the Broward County Commission. He is a member of the Republican Party.

Scott was born in Pikeville, Kentucky. He attended the University of Kentucky, where he earned his BA and JD.

In 1976, Scott was elected to the Florida Senate. In 1994, he became President of the Florida Senate. He left the State Senate in 2000.

On December 12, 2000, Governor Jeb Bush appointed Scott to the Broward County Commission. He replaced Scott Cowan. His term expired on November 19, 2006, after he lost reelection to Ken Keechl.

After Mel Martínez resigned from the U.S. Senate in 2009, Governor Charlie Crist considered appointing Scott to fill the remainder of the vacancy. Ultimately, the position went to George LeMieux.

References

External links
 Profile at Tripp Scott

|-

|-

1942 births
20th-century American politicians
Republican Party Florida state senators
Living people
People from Pikeville, Kentucky
University of Kentucky College of Law alumni
University of Kentucky alumni